Oneness organisation is a non-profit organisation founded in 2008 in Andhra Pradesh, India. Initially it worked to improve the quality of education in rural areas. In 2009 the organization began working on wide spread issues which include Medical Projects, Sanitation Projects, Youth Development programs, and Motivation Projects.

History 
The organization was founded by Kundhan Karunakar. Oneness organisation is registered in Andhra Pradesh and its operation spread across Visakhapatnam, Vizianagaram, Srikakulam, Rajam, Hyderabad, Ahmedabad and Lucknow.

References

External links 
 website

2008 establishments in Andhra Pradesh
Non-profit organisations based in India